Susannah Leydon-Davis (born 5 February 1992) is a New Zealand badminton player. In 2014, she competed at the Commonwealth Games in Glasgow, Scotland.

Career 
Originally from Hamilton, Leydon-Davis attended Hillcrest High School and was Sports Captain in 2009. In 2015 she graduated from the University of Waikato with a Bachelor of Management Studies. She competed at the Commonwealth Games in Glasgow July 2014. Susannah competes in the mixed doubles with her brother Oliver, and they have actively been New Zealand representatives. She and her brother, won the mixed doubles gold medal at the 2014 Oceania Badminton Championships. Teamed up with Kevin Dennerly-Minturn she won the Waikato International tournament in the mixed doubles event.

Achievements

Oceania Championships 
Women's doubles

Mixed doubles

BWF International Challenge/Series
Women's doubles

Mixed doubles

 BWF International Challenge tournament
 BWF International Series tournament
 BWF Future Series tournament

References

External links 
 

Living people
1992 births
Sportspeople from Hamilton, New Zealand
New Zealand female badminton players
Commonwealth Games competitors for New Zealand
Badminton players at the 2014 Commonwealth Games
Badminton players at the 2018 Commonwealth Games
University of Waikato alumni